This is a list of University of Warwick people, including office holders, current and former academics and  alumni of the University of Warwick, including a brief description of their notability.

Warwick has over 150,000 alumni and an active alumni network.

Former students

Academics
 Janet Beer - Vice-Chancellor of the University of Liverpool
 Robert Calderbank - former Dean of Natural Sciences at Duke University and winner of the IEEE Richard W. Hamming Medal and the Claude E. Shannon Award
 David Cardwell FREng - superconducting engineer and head of the Cambridge University Engineering Department
 Colin Cooper - Professor of Cancer Genetics at the University of East Anglia
 John Fauvel - historian of mathematics at the Open University
 Luciano Floridi - philosopher of information
 Oliver Hart - economist and former Chairman of the Harvard Economics Department, Winner of the Nobel Prize in Economics 2016
 H.A. Hellyer - policy consultant and Senior Research Fellow for Muslims in Europe
 Alan Hywel Jones - Principal Research Fellow and senior consultant at Sheffield Hallam University, materials scientist and inventor
 Maris Martinsons - Professor of Management; international business consultant
 Moeletsi Mbeki - Deputy Chairman of the South African Institute of International Affairs; brother of former South African President Thabo Mbeki
 Patricia McFadden - Swazi author; Professor of Sociology; African radical feminist
 Stuart Neil - professor of virology at King's College London
 Pippa Norris - political scientist and McGuire Lecturer in Comparative Politics at the Kennedy School of Government, Harvard University
 Ian Stewart FRS - popular science author; Professor of Mathematics
 Leslie Valiant FRS - British computer scientist and Turing Award winner

Art
 Benjamin Hope (Mathematics and Physics 1996) - painter

Business

Ian Gorham - CEO of Hargreaves Lansdown
Bernardo Hees - CEO of the Heinz Company; former CEO of Burger King
Linda Jackson - CEO of Citroën
Nick Landau - co-owner and founder of Titan Entertainment Group and Forbidden Planet sci-fi, fantasy and horror bookstores
Margaret Milan - founder and owner of Eveil & Jeux
Mahmoud Mohieldin (PhD Financial Economics, 1995) - former Investment Minister of Egypt; current Managing Director of the World Bank
Ada Osakwe - economist, entrepreneur and corporate executive
Ralf Speth - CEO of Jaguar Land Rover
Mary Turner - CEO of Koovs
Jehangir Wadia - Indian Businessman, Managing Director of Go First, Bombay Dyeing and Bombay Realty, Director on the Boards of Britannia Industries   
Ness Wadia - Indian Businessman, managing director of Bombay Burmah Trading Corporation, co-owner of the Indian Premier League cricket team Punjab Kings 
Tony Wheeler - founder of Lonely Planet travel guides
Nigel Wilson - CEO of Legal & General Group plc
George Yankey - CEO of Ghana Gas Company & former Minister of Health in Ghana
Rajiv Bajaj - Managing director and CEO of Bajaj Auto
Sanjiv Bajaj - Managing director of Bajaj Finserv
Lakshmi Venu - Director at TVS Motor Company, daughter of Venu Srinivasan

Cinema and theatre
 Paul W. S. Anderson (Film and Literature) – film director
 Adam Buxton (dropped out after two terms) – comedian and actor, best known as part of Adam and Joe
 Dominic Cooke – artistic director of the Royal Court Theatre
 Paul Darke (PhD in Film) - academic, artist and disability rights activist, creator of the ''normality drama' theory
 Brett Goldstein (Film & Feminism) – actor and comedian
 Vadim Jean (History) – film director
 Alex Jennings (English and Theatre Studies 1978) – actor who has performed in many lead roles at the RSC
 Ruth Jones (Theatre Studies and Dramatic Arts 1988) – actress known as Myfanwy in Little Britain and Nessa in Gavin & Stacey
 Lloyd Langford – comedian (film and television)
 Stephen Merchant (Film and Literature 1996) – wrote, directed and acted in the British television series The Office and Extras, in such roles as the 'Oggmonster' and 'Darren Lamb' respectively.
 Julian Rhind-Tutt (English) – actor, known from the award-winning comedy series Green Wing
 Frank Skinner, then Chris Collins (MA in English Literature 1981) – comedian, actor, writer
 Hannah Waterman – actress

Government and politics

 Wendy Alexander MSP (MA, Industrial Relations) – former Labour Leader in the Scottish Parliament
 Luis Arce (Master's in Economics, 1997) – President of Bolivia, former Minister of Economy and Public Finance in Bolivia
 Joseph Ngute - Prime Minister, Head of Government of the Republic of Cameroon
 Valerie Amos, Baroness Amos (Sociology 1976) – Britain's first female black Cabinet Minister, formerly Leader of the House of Lords, Lord President of the Council and British High Commissioner to Australia; and now Under-Secretary-General for Humanitarian Affairs and Emergency Relief Coordinator at the UN
 Tim Barrow – diplomat and British Ambassador to Russia since 2011
 Yunus Carrim – Minister of Communications of South Africa
 Chan Yuen Han SBS - JP; active female unionists in Hong Kong
 Vernon Coaker (BA (Hons) Politics and Economics) – Member of Parliament for Gedling and Government Minister until 2010
 Jon Cruddas (PhD in Philosophy, 1990) – Member of Parliament for Dagenham and formerly a candidate for deputy leadership of the Labour Party
 David Davis (Molecular Science/Computer Science, 1968–1971) – Conservative MP and former  Secretary of State for Exiting the EU
 Claire Darke, (Certificate of Social Work) - 161st Mayor of Wolverhampton
 Yakubu Gowon (PhD in Political Science) – former President of Nigeria
 Andy Haldane (Economics) – chief economist at the Bank of England
 Kim Howells (PhD) – former Foreign Office Minister
 Guðni Thorlacius Jóhannesson – President of Iceland
 George Chouliarakis - Academic and Greek Alternate Minister of Finance
 George W. Kanyeihamba – Member of the Supreme Court of Uganda and African Court on Human and Peoples' Rights; Legal Advisor to the President of Uganda on Human Rights and International Affairs
 Sir Bob Kerslake – Head of the Home Civil Service
 Andrea Leadsom (Political Science) – Conservative Member of Parliament for South Northamptonshire and Secretary of State for the Environment
 Sir Richard Leese – Leader of Manchester City Council
 David Li GBM, GBS, OBE – JP, Chairman and Chief Executive of the Bank of East Asia; member of the Legislative Council of Hong Kong; former member of the Executive Council of Hong Kong
 Tim Loughton (Classical Civilisation) – Conservative former Parliamentary Under-Secretary of State for Children and Families
 Estelle Morris, Baroness Morris of Yardley – Privy Counsellor; former Labour Secretary of State for Education; graduated from Coventry College of Education
 Lord Gus O'Donnell (Economics 1973) – former Cabinet Secretary and Head of the Home Civil Service
 Lord Brian Paddick – former Deputy Assistant Commissioner in the Metropolitan Police and London Mayoral candidate for the Liberal Democrats in 2008 and 2012
 José Fernando Franco González Salas – Ministry of the Supreme Court of Justice of Mexico
 George Saitoti – Former Vice-President of Kenya, former Executive Chairman of the World Bank and the International Monetary Fund and former President of the African, Caribbean and Pacific Group of States (ACP)
 Dan Stoenescu – Romanian diplomat and Former Minister for Romanians Abroad  
 Valentine Strasser – former head of state of Sierra Leone; did not complete his studies at Warwick
 Aung Tun Thet – Myanmar economist and the Economic Advisor to the President of Burma
Carrie Symonds - British political activist, conservationist and Partner of Boris Johnson

History
 David Englander - historian and author

Literature

 Nicholas Blincoe – author
 Simon Calder (Mathematics) – travel writer for The Independent
 Jonathan Coe (English Literature) – novelist and writer
 Sarah Crossan, Irish author. 
 Anne Fine (History '68) FRSL – children's author
 James Franklin (Mathematics) – historian of ideas; philosopher
 Sam Gillespie – philosopher and early translator and commentator of Alain Badiou, crucial to Badiou's initial reception in the English-speaking world
 Mal Lewis Jones (English and American literature '70) – children's author
 A.L. Kennedy (Theatre and Performance Studies) – author
 Peter Linebaugh (History '75) – author of The Magna Carta Manifesto
 Sally Nicholls (Philosophy and Literature '05) - children's and young adult author
 Mal Peet – author, writer of popular young adult literature, Keeper, Tamar, others...
 Robin Stevens, children's author
 Chip Tsao (pen name: To Kit) (English Literature) – Hong Kong cultural and political commentator
Patrick M. Vollmer – House of Lords Librarian
 Tony Wheeler (Engineering '68) – co-founder of Lonely Planet (LP) travel guides
 Yilin Zhong (Cultural Studies '05) – journalist and author of 8 books, novel "Chinatown" released in 2011.

Law
Constance Briscoe – disgraced barrister convicted of perverting the course of justice
Phil Shiner (LLM '85) – lawyer struck off for misconduct

Media

 Camila Batmanghelidjh – charity executive
 Jennie Bond (French and European Literature 1968) – former BBC Royal correspondent
 Brian Deer (Philosophy) – The Sunday Times; Channel 4
 Tom Dunmore (Film & Literature) – Editor In Chief, Stuff Magazine
 George Eaton – political editor of the New Statesman
 Giles Fletcher (Computer Science 1987) – glam rock artist
 Janan Ganesh (Politics) – Financial Times journalist
 Leona Graham (Drama) – radio presenter and VoiceOver artis
 Merfyn Jones – Governor BBC and former Vice-Chancellor of the University of Wales, Bangor
 James King (Film and Literature) – BBC Radio 1 film critic
 Timmy Mallett (History 1977) – 1980s children's television presenter
 Simon Mayo (History and Politics 1981) – broadcaster
 Peter Salmon (European Literature 1977) – BBC television executive
 Tim Vickery (History and Politics) – South American football correspondent for BBC Sport, ESPN and an analyst on SporTV's main morning programme, Redação SporTV.
 Christian Wolmar (1971) – writer on transport and social issues
Dawn Foster (English 2009) - British journalist, broadcaster and author

Music

 DJ Yoda (English and American Literature 1998) – Hip hop turntablist
 Gareth Emery – DJ and founder of electronic label Garuda, rated world's no.14 DJ in 2012
 Roxanne Emery – solo singer/songwriter artist, founder of LATE records
 Adem Ilhan (studied Mathematics) – solo artist; member of Fridge 
 Kode9 (PhD in Philosophy) – dubstep producer, DJ and owner of the Hyperdub record label
 Sting (left after one term) – lead singer of The Police and solo artist 
 Very Rev Robert Willis – Dean of Canterbury, composer of hymns

Sport
 Kevin Blackwell (Certificate in Applied Management in Football) – football manager
 Aidy Boothroyd (Certificate in Applied Management in Football) – football manager
 Steve Heighway (Economics) – Liverpool F.C. footballer
 Mark Hughes (Certificate in Applied Management in Football) – football manager
 Stuart Pearce MBE (Certificate in Applied Management in Football) – football manager

Notable faculty and staff
Notable current and former faculty and staff at Warwick include:

Biological sciences
 Sir Howard Dalton FRS
 Sir Brian Follett - also formerly Warwick University's Vice-Chancellor (1993-2001)

Chemistry
Keith Jennings - known for work in mass spectrometry and collision-induced dissociation

Classics and Ancient History
Alison E. Cooley - Roman historian
James Davidson - social historian of Ancient Greece
Michael Scott - ancient historian and broadcaster
Zahra Newby - historian of Ancient art and the visual culture of festivals
Victoria Rimell - latinist 
Simon Swain - scholar of Greek culture under Rome

English

 Susan Bassnett - translation theorist and scholar of comparative literature
 Jonathan Bate
 Andrew Davies - television screenwriter
 Sir Michael Edwards OBE - first Briton to be voted into the Académie française
 Maureen Freely - writer, author and translator of works by Orhan Pamuk
 K. W. Gransden - poet and critic; one of the founders of the English Department
 Germaine Greer - former Professor of English and Comparative Literature
 A L Kennedy
 China Miéville - fiction writer
 David Vann - creative writing professor

Engineering and computer science 

 Lord Bhattacharyya - founder and Director of the Warwick Manufacturing Group
 Mike Cowlishaw - creator of the REXX programming language
 Hugh Darwen - creator of Tutorial D database language
 Mike Paterson FRS - former director of the Centre for Discrete Mathematics and its Applications
 Kevin Warwick - cyborg researcher

History
 David Arnold FBA - Indian historian
 Sir John Elliott FBA - Spanish historian
 Sir J.R. Hale - Renaissance historian and first Professor of History at Warwick University
 E.P. Thompson -  Marxist historian and founding member of the CND

Law
 Shaheen Sardar Ali - Professor of Law
 Patrick Atiyah - barrister and legal writer
 Upendra Baxi - Professor of Law
 John McEldowney - Professor of Public Law
 Paul Raffield - Professor of Law; actor in Joking Apart

Mathematics and statistics

 Brian Bowditch - mathematician known for contributions to geometry and topology, and for solving the angel problem
 Jack Cohen - developmental biologist; xenobiologist; honorary professor
 David Epstein FRS - mathematician known for his work in hyperbolic geometry; co-founder of the University of Warwick mathematics department
 Martin Hairer FRS - expert in stochastic partial differential equations; winner of the Fields Medal, Philip Leverhulme Prize, the Royal Society Wolfson Award and the LMS Whitehead Prize
 Wilfrid Kendall - probabalist and president of the Bernoulli Society for Mathematical Statistics and Probability (2013 - 2015)
 Robert Sinclair MacKay FRS - mathematician known for his work on dynamical systems; current president of the Institute of Mathematics and its Applications
 David Preiss FRS - winner of the 2008 Pólya Prize for his contributions to analysis and geometric measure theory
 Miles Reid FRS - mathematician known for work in algebraic geometry
 Gareth Roberts FRS, statistician known for work on Markov chain Monte Carlo methodology; winner of the Royal Statistical Society Guy Medal in Silver and Bronze; an ISI highly cited researcher
 Ian Stewart FRS - mathematician, popular science author and an ISI highly cited researcher
 Andrew M. Stuart - mathematician known for his contributions to numerical analysis and computational mathematics; winner of the Leslie Fox Prize for Numerical Analysis
 Sir Christopher Zeeman FRS - topologist; exponent of catastrophe theory; founding professor of mathematics; former President of the London Mathematical Society; namesake of the Mathematics and Statistics building; Principal of Hertford College, Oxford

Philosophy
 Quassim Cassam - Professor of Philosophy
 Angie Hobbs - Lecturer
Nick Land - Former lecturer, known as the father of accelerationism
 David Miller - Emeritus Reader of Philosophy
 Peter Poellner - Professor of Philosophy

Social sciences
 Lady Margaret Archer - theorist in critical realism; former President of International Sociological Association; current president of Pontifical Academy of Social Sciences
 Sir George Bain - former Chairman of the School of Industrial and Business Studies
 Söhnke M. Bartram - Professor of Finance
 James A. Beckford -  Professor Emeritus of Sociology
 Jim Bulpitt - Professor of Politics
 Robin Cohen - honorary professor
 Nicholas Crafts - professor of economics and economic history
 Avinash Dixit - economist
 Robert Fine - Professor Emeritus, theorist of cosmopolitanism
 Steve Fuller - Professor of Sociology, theorist in science and technology studies
 Wyn Grant - former Chair of the British Political Studies Association (2002-2005); President of the PSA (2005-2008) Political scientist with interest in comparative public policy
 Peter J. Hammond - Professor of Economics
 H. A. Hellyer - senior research Fellow; specialist on Muslims in Europe and West-Muslim world relations
 Richard Higgott - Director of the Warwick Commission to the World Bank
 Abhinay Muthoo - Professor of Economics and  Dean of Warwick in London
 Andrew Oswald - Professor of Economics
 Tobias Preis - Associate Professor of Behavioural Science and Finance
 John Rex - Professor Emeritus
 Sir Ken Robinson - Professor Emeritus of Education
 Leonard Seabrooke - Professor of International Political Economy 
 Robert Skidelsky, Baron Skidelsky - Professor Emeritus of Political Economy
 Nicholas Stern, Baron Stern of Brentford FBA - former Chief Economist of the World Bank
 Susan Strange - political economist and former chair of International Relations
 Mark P. Taylor - Dean of Warwick Business School and Professor of International Finance
 John Williamson - English economist who coined the term Washington Consensus
 Sarah D. Goode - Former lecturer in child health at Warwick Medical School

Other
 The Coull String Quartet - quartet-in-residence since 1977
 Koen Lamberts - psychologist, Vice-Chancellor of the University of York
 Mark Smith, - physicist, Vice-Chancellor of Lancaster University
 Nigel Thrift - geographer, Vice-Chancellor of the University of Warwick

Administration

Chancellors

 William Rootes, 1st Baron Rootes - Chancellor-designate (died in December 1964 before taking office)
 Cyril Radcliffe, 1st Viscount Radcliffe (1965–1977)
 Leslie Scarman, Baron Scarman (1977–1989)
 Sir Shridath "Sonny" Ramphal (1989–2002)
 Sir Nicholas Scheele (2003–2008)
 Sir Richard Lambert (2008–2016)
 Catherine Ashton, Baroness Ashton of Upholland (2017–present)

Vice-Chancellors
 Jack Butterworth, Baron Butterworth (1965–1985)
 Clark L. Brundin (1985–1992)
 Sir Brian K. Follett (1993–2001)
 David VandeLinde (2001–2006)
 Nigel Thrift (2006–2016)
 Stuart Croft (2016–present)

References

University of Warwick

Warwick